Moriah Central School District is a school district in Port Henry, New York, United States. The superintendent is William Larrow. The district operates two schools: Moriah Junior Senior High School and Moriah Elementary School.

Administration 
The District offices are located at 39 Viking Lane in Port Henry. The current Superintendent is William Larrow.

Selected Former Superintendents 
Previous assignment and reason for departure denoted in parentheses
Milton J. Tesar–1977-1980 (Principal - Moriah Central School, named Principal of Waterloo High School)
Larry Northup
Harold P. Bresett–?-2006

Moriah Junior/Senior High School 

Moriah Junior/Senior High School is located at 39 Viking Lane and serves grades 7 through 12. The current interim principal is Alison Burch.

History

Selected former principals 
Previous assignment and reason for departure denoted in parentheses
Milton Tesar–1975-1978 (Assistant Principal - Cambridge Central School, named Superintendent of Moriah Central School) 
Michael DeWeese-1980s
Alonzo "Jack" Roberts-1990s
James M. Rovito-1998-2000
David Blades–2000-2002
Frank Devine–2002-2003
Cathy Carr 2004-2010

Moriah Elementary School 

Moriah Elementary School is located at 39 Viking Lane and serves grades PK through 6. The current principal is Mrs. Valerie Stahl.

References

External links
Official site

School districts in New York (state)
Education in Essex County, New York